The Aulopidae are a small family of aulopiform fish. They are found in most tropical and subtropical oceans, and are commonly known as flagfins.

They have large dorsal fins, the first ray of which is greatly extended.

References

Aulopiformes
Ray-finned fish families